Hocking and Company Pty. Ltd. was a publishing company based in Kalgoorlie, Western Australia. It was founded in 1896 by Sidney Edwin Hocking.

It published the daily newspaper The Kalgoorlie Miner. The company maintained a lengthy relationship with the goldfields community as publisher and local patron of community activities.

The Hocking family kept the company operational until selling it to The West Australian in 1970.

Newspapers
 Kalgoorlie Miner newspaper, 1895–present
 Western Argus newspaper, 1894–1938

References

	 

City of Kalgoorlie–Boulder
Publishing companies established in 1896
Publishing companies disestablished in 1970
1970 mergers and acquisitions
Companies based in Western Australia
Publishing companies of Australia
Defunct publishing companies
Defunct companies of Australia
Australian companies disestablished in 1970
Australian companies established in 1896